Exception To The Rule is a 1997 Canadian-German erotic thriller film directed by David Winning and stars Kim Cattrall, Eric McCormack, Sean Young and William Devane.

Plot summary
A married jewel trader is seduced by a beautiful woman while on a business trip. Upon returning home, he receives a video tape in the mail of his tryst and a threat to ruin his marriage if he doesn't turn a shipment of diamonds over to the woman.

Cast

Release
It premiered in Japan on  April 5, 1997 and in the US as part of the 1997 Houston Film Festival  The feature was released on VHS by Artisan Entertainment on June 15, 1999.

Reception
Joe Leydon, of Variety, said there's a certain novelty to seeing Young cast against type and Cattrall is good for a few laughs as she throws herself into her devious character with lip-smacking, dirty-mouthed relish.

References

External links

1997 films
1990s erotic thriller films
1990s English-language films
English-language Canadian films
English-language German films
Films directed by David Winning
Girls with guns films
Canadian erotic thriller films
Films with screenplays by Shuki Levy
Films with screenplays by Shell Danielson
1990s Canadian films